Rubus macrogongylus is a Mesoamerican species of brambles in the rose family. It grows in the State of Chiapas in southern Mexico as well as in the Central American nations of Guatemala and Nicaragua.

Rubus macrogongylus is an arching shrub up to 250 cm tall, with wool and curved prickles. Leaves are compound with 3 leathery leaflets. Fruits are black.

References

macrogongylus
Flora of Nicaragua
Flora of Guatemala
Flora of Chiapas
Plants described in 1911